Fritiof Normann Andersen (30 May 1898 – 24 January 1954) was a Danish track and field athlete who competed in the 1920 Summer Olympics. In 1920 he was a member of the Danish relay team which finished fifth in the 4 × 100 metre relay competition. He also participated in the 100 metre event but was eliminated in the first round.

References

External links
list of Danish athletes

1898 births
1954 deaths
Danish male sprinters
Olympic athletes of Denmark
Athletes (track and field) at the 1920 Summer Olympics